Painting the Town is a 1927 American comedy film directed by William James Craft and written by Harry O. Hoyt, Vin Moore and Albert DeMond. The film stars Glenn Tryon, Patsy Ruth Miller, Charles K. Gerrard, George Fawcett, Sidney Bracey and Max Asher. The film was released on August 7, 1927, by Universal Pictures.

Cast         
Glenn Tryon as Hector Whitmore
Patsy Ruth Miller as Patsy Deveau
Charles K. Gerrard as Raymond Tyson 
George Fawcett as Fire Commissioner
Sidney Bracey as Secretary
Max Asher as Wilson 
Monte Collins as Justice of the Peace

References

External links
 

1927 films
1920s English-language films
Silent American comedy films
1927 comedy films
Universal Pictures films
Films directed by William James Craft
American silent feature films
American black-and-white films
1920s American films